Diogo Sclebin (born 6 May 1982) is a Brazilian triathlete.

At the 2012 Summer Olympics men's triathlon on Tuesday, August 7, he placed 44th.

References 

1982 births
Living people
Brazilian male triathletes
Triathletes at the 2012 Summer Olympics
Triathletes at the 2016 Summer Olympics
Olympic triathletes of Brazil
Triathletes at the 2015 Pan American Games
Triathletes at the 2019 Pan American Games
Pan American Games competitors for Brazil
20th-century Brazilian people
21st-century Brazilian people